Iwannis Louis Awad (17 April 1934 – 18 November 2020) was a Syriac Catholic bishop.

Awad was born in Syria and was ordained to the priesthood in 1957. He served as titular bishop of 'Zeugma in Syria' and as apostolic exarch of the Syriac Catholic Apostolic Exarchate of Venezuela from 2003 to 2011.

Notes

1934 births
2020 deaths
Syriac Catholic bishops